Italian East Africa (AOI) was an Italian colony in the Horn of Africa. It was formed in 1936 through the merger of Italian Somalia, Italian Eritrea, and the newly occupied Ethiopian Empire, conquered in the Second Italo-Ethiopian War.

Italian East Africa was divided into six governorates. Eritrea and Somalia, Italian possessions since the 1880s, were enlarged with captured Ethiopian territory and became the Eritrea and Somalia Governorates. The remainder of "Italian Ethiopia" consisted the Harar, Galla-Sidamo, Amhara, and Scioa Governorates. Fascist colonial policy had a divide and conquer characteristic, and favoured the Oromos, the Somalis and other Muslims in an attempt to weaken their ties to the Amharas who had been the ruling ethnic group in the Ethiopian Empire.

During the Second World War, Italian East Africa was occupied by a British-led force including colonial units and Ethiopian guerrillas in November 1941. After the war, Italian Somalia and Eritrea came under British administration, while Ethiopia regained its independence. In 1950, occupied Somalia became the United Nations Trust Territory of Somaliland, administered by Italy from 1950 until its independence in 1960. Occupied Eritrea became an autonomous part of Ethiopia in 1952, and was later annexed by the Ethiopian Empire in 1962.

History

Conquest of Ethiopia 

Historians are still divided about the reasons for the Italian attack on Ethiopia in 1935. Some Italian historians such as Franco Catalano and Giorgio Rochat argue that the invasion was an act of social imperialism, contending that the Great Depression had badly damaged Benito Mussolini's prestige, and that he needed a foreign war to distract public opinion. Other historians such as Pietro Pastorelli have argued that the invasion was launched as part of an expansionist program to make Italy the main power in the Red Sea area and the Middle East. A middle way interpretation was offered by the American historian MacGregor Knox, who argued that the war was started for both foreign and domestic reasons, being both a part of Mussolini's long-range expansionist plans and intended to give Mussolini a foreign policy triumph that would allow him to push the Fascist system in a more radical direction at home.

Unlike forty years earlier, Italy's forces were far superior to the Ethiopian forces, especially in air power, and they were soon victorious. Emperor Haile Selassie was forced to flee the country, with Italian forces entering the capital city, Addis Ababa, to proclaim an "Italian Empire of Ethiopia" by 5 May 1936. Some Ethiopians welcomed the Italians and collaborated with them in the government of the newly created Italian Empire, like Ras Seyoum Mengesha, Ras Getachew Abate and Ras Kebbede Guebret. In 1937 the friendship of Seyoum Mengesha with the Italian Viceroy Prince Amedeo, Duke of Aosta enabled this Ras to play an influential role in securing the release of 3,000 Ethiopian POWs being held in Italian Somaliland.

The Italian victory in the war coincided with the zenith of the international popularity of Mussolini's Fascist regime, during which colonialist leaders praised Mussolini for his actions. Mussolini's international popularity decreased as he endorsed the annexation of Austria by Nazi Germany, beginning a political tilt toward Germany that eventually led to the downfall of Mussolini and the Fascist regime in Italy in World War II. Italian East Africa was formed on 1 June 1936, shortly after the conquest, by merging the pre-existing colonies of Italian Somaliland and Italian Eritrea with the newly conquered territory. The maintenance and creation of Ethiopian colonies was very costly.

Second World War and dissolution 

On 10 June 1940, Italy declared war on Britain and France, which made Italian military forces in Libya a threat to Egypt and those in the Italian East Africa a danger to the British and French territories in the Horn of Africa. Italian belligerence also closed the Mediterranean to Allied merchant ships and endangered British supply routes along the coast of East Africa, the Gulf of Aden, Red Sea and the Suez Canal. (The Kingdom of Egypt remained neutral during World War II, but the Anglo-Egyptian Treaty of 1936 allowed the British to occupy Egypt and Anglo-Egyptian Sudan.) Egypt, the Suez Canal, French Somaliland and British Somaliland were also vulnerable to invasion, but the Comando Supremo (Italian General Staff) had planned for a war after 1942. In the summer of 1940, Italy was far from ready for a long war or for the occupation of large areas of Africa.

Hostilities began on 13 June 1940, with an Italian air raid on the base of 1 Squadron Southern Rhodesian Air Force (237 (Rhodesia) Squadron RAF) at Wajir in the East Africa Protectorate (Kenya). In August 1940, the protectorate of British Somaliland was occupied by Italian forces and absorbed into Italian East Africa. This occupation lasted around six months.

By early 1941, Italian forces had been largely pushed back from Kenya and Sudan. On 6 April 1941, Addis Ababa was occupied by the 11th (African) Division, which received the surrender of the city. The remnants of the Italian forces in the AOI surrendered after the Battle of Gondar in November 1941, except for groups that fought an Italian guerrilla war in Ethiopia against the British until the Armistice of Cassibile (3 September 1943) ended hostilities between Italy and the Allies.

In January 1942, with the final official surrender of the Italians, the British, under American pressure, signed an interim Anglo-Ethiopian Agreement with Selassie, acknowledging Ethiopian sovereignty. Makonnen Endelkachew was named as Prime Minister and on 19 December 1944, the final Anglo-Ethiopian Agreement was signed.

In the peace treaty of February 1947, Italy officially renounced sovereignty over its African colonies. Eritrea was placed under British military administration for the duration, and in 1950, it became part of Ethiopia. After 1945, Britain controlled both Somalilands, as protectorates. In November 1949, the United Nations granted Italy trusteeship of Italian Somaliland under close supervision, on condition that Somalia achieve independence within ten years. British Somaliland became independent on 26 June 1960 as the State of Somaliland, the Trust Territory of Somalia (ex-Italian Somaliland) became independent on 1 July 1960 and the territories united as the Somali Republic.

Colonial administration

The colony was administered by a Viceroy of Ethiopia and Governor General of Italian East Africa, appointed by the Italian king. The dominion was further divided for administrative purposes into six governorates, further divided into forty commissariati.

Territory

When established in 1936, Italian East Africa consisted of the old Italian possessions in the Horn of Africa: Italian Eritrea and Italian Somaliland, combined with the recently conquered Empire of Ethiopia. Victor Emmanuel III of Italy consequently adopted the title of "Emperor of Ethiopia", although this was not recognized by any country other than Nazi Germany and Imperial Japan. The territory was divided into the six governorates: Eritrea and Somalia, consisting of the respective former colonies, enlarged with territory from Ethiopia. The remainder of "Italian Ethiopia" consisted of the Harar, Galla-Sidamo, Amhara, and Addis Abeba Governorates. The Addis Abeba Governorate was enlarged into the Scioa Governorate with territory from neighboring Harar, Galla-Sidamo and Amhara in November 1938.

Italian East Africa was briefly enlarged in 1940, as Italian forces invaded British Somaliland, thereby bringing all Somali territories, aside from the small colony of French Somaliland, under Italian administration. However, the enlarged colony was dismembered only a year later, when in the course of the East African campaign the colony was occupied by British forces.

Economic development

Fascist colonial policy in Italian East Africa had a divide and conquer characteristic. To weaken the Orthodox Christian Amhara people who had run Ethiopia in the past, territory claimed by Eritrean Tigray-Tigrinyas and Somalis was given to the Eritrea Governorate and Somalia Governorate. Reconstruction efforts after the war in 1936 were partially focused on benefiting the Muslim peoples in the colony at the expense of the Amhara to strengthen support by Muslims for the Italian colony.

Italy's Fascist regime encouraged Italian peasants to colonize Ethiopia by setting up farms and small manufacturing businesses. However, few Italians came to the Ethiopian colony, with most going to Eritrea and Somalia. While Italian Eritrea enjoyed some degree of development, supported by nearly 80,000 Italian colonists, by 1940 only 3,200 farmers had arrived in Ethiopia, less than ten percent of the Fascist regime's goal. Continued insurgency by native Ethiopians, lack of natural resources, rough terrain, and uncertainty of political and military conditions discouraged development and settlement in the countryside.

The Italians invested substantively in Ethiopian infrastructure development. They created the "imperial road" between Addis Ababa and Massaua, Addis Ababa and Mogadishu and Addis Ababa - Assab. 900 km of railways were reconstructed or initiated (like the railway between Addis Ababa and Assab), dams and hydroelectric plants were built, and many public and private companies were established in the underdeveloped country. The most important were: "Compagnie per il cotone d'Etiopia" (Cotton industry); "Cementerie d'Etiopia" (Cement industry); "Compagnia etiopica mineraria" (Minerals industry); "Imprese elettriche d'Etiopia" (Electricity industry); "Compagnia etiopica degli esplosivi" (Armament industry); "Trasporti automobilistici (Citao)" (Mechanic & Transport industry).

Italians even created new airports and in 1936 started the world famous Linea dell'Impero, a flight connecting Addis Ababa to Rome. The line was opened after the Italian conquest of Ethiopia and was followed by the first air links with the Italian colonies in Africa Orientale Italiana (Italian East Africa), which began in a pioneering way since 1934. The route was enlarged to 6,379 km and initially joined Rome with Addis Ababa via Syracuse, Benghazi, Cairo, Wadi Halfa, Khartoum, Kassala, Asmara, Dire Dawa. There was a change of aircraft in Benghazi (or sometimes in Tripoli). The route was carried out in three and a half days of daytime flight and the frequency was four flights per week in both directions. Later from Addis Ababa there were three flights a week that continued to Mogadishu, capital of Italian Somalia.

The most important railway line in the African colonies of the Kingdom of Italy, the 784 km long Djibouti-Addis Ababa, was acquired following the conquest of the Ethiopian Empire by the Italians in 1936. The route was served until 1935 by steam trains that took about 36 hours to do the total trip between the capital of Ethiopia and the port of Djibouti. In 1938 following the Italian conquest, train speed was increased with the introduction of four high capacity railcars "type 038" derived from the model Fiat ALn56.

These diesel trains were able to reach 70 km/h and so the time travel was cut in half to just 18 hours: they were used until the mid 1960s. At the main stations there were some bus connections to the other cities of Italian Ethiopia not served by the railway. Additionally, near the Addis Ababa station was created a special unit against fire, that was the only one in all Africa.

However Ethiopia and Africa Orientale Italiana (AOI) proved to be extremely expensive to maintain, as the budget for the fiscal year 1936-37 had been set at 19.136 billion lira to create the necessary infrastructure for the colony. At the time, Italy's entire yearly revenue was only 18.581 billion lira.

The architects of the Fascist regime had drafted grandiose urbanistic projects for the enlargement of Addis Ababa, in order to build a state-of-the-art capital of the Africa Orientale Italiana, but these architectural plans -like all the other developments- were stopped by World War II.

Education
Prior to Fascism, education in Italian East Africa had primarily been the responsibility of both Roman Catholic and Protestant missionaries. With Mussolini's rise to power, government schools were created which eventually incorporated the Catholic missionaries' educational programmes while those of the Protestant missionaries became marginalised and circumscribed. Andrea Festa, who was made director of the central office governing primary education in Eritrea in November 1932, declared in 1934 that Fascist efforts in education needed to ensure that native Africans were "acquainted with a little of our civilisation" and that they needed to "know Italy, its glories, and ancient history, in order to, become a conscious militia man in the shade of our flag." Such education initiatives were designed to train Africans in a variety of practical tasks useful to the Fascist regime as well as to indoctrinate them with the tenets and lifestyle of Fascist ideology with the aim of creating citizens obedient and subservient to the state. Their propagandistic nature was especially apparent in history textbooks issued to African children, which entirely omitted any discussion of events such as Italian disunity, Giuseppe Mazzini's "Young Italy" movement, the revolutions of 1848, or Giuseppe Garibaldi's Expedition of the Thousand and instead stressed the "glories" of the Roman Empire and those of the Italian state that claimed to be its successor. Glorification and lionisation of Mussolini and his "great work" likewise pervaded them, while periods during which Libya and other then-Italian possessions had been controlled by older, non-Italian empires, such as the Ottoman Empire, were portrayed through an unflattering lens. Use of the Fascist salute was mandatory in schools for African children, who were constantly encouraged to become "little soldiers of the Duce", and every day there was morning ceremony at which the Italian flag was hoisted and patriotic songs were sung. Italian children, whose education the Fascist government prioritised over that of Africans, received education similar to that in Fascist Italy's metropole, though with some aspects of it tailored to the local situation in East Africa. Fascist Italy sought to neutralise any educational institutions which provided instruction to Africans beyond the level expected by Fascist ideology, in particular the secondary education network that prior to the Italian invasion had prepared and enabled a relatively small but significant amount of Ethiopians to study abroad at universities in Europe.

In February 1937, following an attempt on the life of Rodolfo Graziani, educated Ethiopians, already having been distrusted by colonial government authorities and many having already been placed in concentration camps, became victims of state-sponsored mass murder, with much of the intelligentsia of Ethiopia being executed and the remainder exiled to penal colonies on Italian-controlled islands in the Mediterranean Sea. Fascist education in the colony proved to be a failure in the end, with only one twentieth of Italian colonial soldiers possessing any literacy. During World War II, which saw the liberation of Italian East Africa from Fascism, few Africans displayed any loyalty to the Fascist state that the state's schools had so fervently tried to instill, and Ethiopia post-World War II found itself impoverished of skilled workers due to the very limited and propagandistic education provided to its non-Italian inhabitants under Mussolini's rule.

Demographics

In 1939, there were 165,267 Italian citizens in the Italian East Africa, the majority of them concentrated around the main urban centres of Asmara, Addis Ababa and Mogadishu. The distribution of population was, however, very uneven.

Italian atrocities 

In February 1937, following many murders of Italian and Eritrean soldiers and an assassination attempt on Italian East Africa's Viceroy, Marshal Rodolfo Graziani, Italian soldiers raided the famous Ethiopian monastery Debre Libanos, where the assassins were believed to have taken refuge, and executed the monks and nuns. Afterwards, Italian soldiers destroyed native settlements in Addis Ababa, which resulted -according to Ethiopian estimates- in nearly 30,000 Ethiopians being killed and their homes left burned to the ground. The massacre has come to be known as Yekatit 12.

After the massacres, Graziani became known as "the Butcher of Ethiopia". He was subsequently removed by Mussolini and replaced by Prince Amedeo, Duke of Aosta, who followed a more conciliatory policy towards the natives, obtaining a huge success in pacifying Ethiopia.

By the eve of the Italian entry into the Second World War (January/February 1940) the Ethiopian guerrillas were still in control of some areas of Harar and the Galla-Sidamo Governorate. Amedeo's conciliatory efforts obtained that Abebe Aregai, then the last leader of the "Arbegnoch" (as the guerrilla fighters were called in Ethiopia) made a surrender proposal to the Italians in the spring of 1940 (after the 1939 surrender of Ethiopian leaders Zaudiè Asfau and Olonà Dinkel). The Italian declaration of war on 10 June 1940 and British influence blocked the surrender proposal.

See also
 List of governors-general of Italian East Africa
 List of governors of the governorates of Italian East Africa
 Dubats
 Political history of Eastern Africa
 Italian Ethiopia
 Italians of Ethiopia
 Italian guerrilla war in Ethiopia
 Italian African Police
 Italian East African lira
 Augusto Turati
 Languages of Africa

Notes

References

Bibliography
 
 
 
 
 
 Tuccimei, Ercole (1999). La Banca d'Italia in Africa, Presentazione di Arnaldo Mauri, Laterza, Bari,  [in Italian].

External links
 Italian East African Armed Forces, 10 June 1940
 1940 Colonial Brigade, 10 June 1940
 Ascari: I Leoni di Eritrea/Ascari: The Eritrean Lions
 Geographic map of Italian business community in Africa (December 2012) 

 
Former colonies in Africa
East Africa
.East Africa
East Africa
Horn of Africa
History of Ethiopia
History of Eritrea
.
.
.
.
.
.
Former Italian-speaking countries
Former countries of the interwar period
Italian military occupations
World War II occupied territories
Ethiopia–Italy relations
Eritrea–Italy relations
Italy–Somalia relations
States and territories established in 1936
States and territories disestablished in 1941
1936 establishments in Africa
1941 disestablishments in Africa
1936 establishments in the Italian Empire
1941 disestablishments in the Italian Empire
20th century in Eritrea
20th century in Ethiopia
20th century in Somalia
20th century in Africa
Real unions
Client states of Fascist Italy